Kevin Edward Locke (Lakota name: Tȟokéya Inážiŋ, meaning "The First to Arise"; June 23, 1954 – September 30, 2022) was of Lakota descent of the Standing Rock Sioux Tribe and Anishinaabe of White Earth. He was a preeminent player of the Native American flute, a traditional storyteller, cultural ambassador, recording artist and educator. He was best-known for his hoop dance, The Hoop of Life.

Biography
Born on June 23, 1954, on the Standing Rock Indian Reservation in South Dakota. It was from his mother, Patricia Locke, his uncle Abraham End-of-Horn, mentor Joe Rock Boy, and many other elders and relatives that Kevin received training in the values, traditions and language of his native Sioux culture.

Locke came from a distinguished family. His great-great-grandfather was the Dakota patriot, Little Crow. His great-grandmother, Mniyáta Ožáŋžaŋ Wiŋ, was a medicine woman. His maternal grandfather was from the White Earth Indian Reservation. His mother, Patricia Locke, was an activist for Indian rights and recognition. His great-grandfather, Bishop Charles Edward Locke, presided over the funeral of U.S. President William McKinley in Buffalo, New York in 1901. The Bishop had known McKinley from boyhood in Canton, Ohio. Although he was white, he was the president of the local branch of the NAACP and the author of Is the Negro Making Good? or, Have Fifty Years of History Vindicated the Wisdom of Abraham Lincoln in Issuing the Emancipation Proclamation?

Locke attended the Institute of American Indian Arts in New Mexico for high school. He received a bachelor of science degree in Elementary Education from the University of North Dakota and earned a master's degree in educational administration from the University of South Dakota. He taught himself to speak Lakota, his ancestral language, as a young adult.  Locke learned the hoop dance, which had nearly died out, from Arlo Good Bear, a Mandan Hidatsa Indian from North Dakota.

Locke, like his mother before him, was widely-known for his work in Lakota language and cultural preservation.

When asked in 2012 about his mission in life, Locke said: "All of the people have the same impulses, spirits, and goals. Through my music and dance, I want to create a positive awareness of oneness of humanity." Locke died on September 30, 2022 at the age of 68, after an asthma attack.

Career

From 1978, he traveled to more than 90 countries to perform and continued to perform, such as in September 2014 and most recently in March 2016. His performances usually consisted of flute playing, singing Lakota songs (some in English), and demonstrations of the Sioux hoop dance, using 28 wooden hoops. Of his presentations, Locke has said "I see myself strictly as a preservationist.... I base my repertoire on the old songs. I try to show younger people what was there, and maybe some of the younger people will pick up from there and compose new music."

Locke served as cultural ambassador for the United States Information Service beginning in 1980, was a delegate to the 1992 Earth Summit in Brazil and was a featured performer and speaker at the 1996 United Nations Habitat II Conference in Turkey.  He recorded twelve albums beginning in 1982, and was an active member of the Baháʼí Faith.

In 1990, he received a National Heritage Fellowship from the National Endowment for the Arts, the highest award granted to such traditional artists. In 2009 he won the $100,000 Bush Foundation Enduring Vision Award.

In April 2006 he performed with Joanne Shenandoah in the photography exhibition "Sacred Legacy:  Edward S. Curtis and the North American Indian" at Cemal Resit Rey Concert Hall and MEB Sura Concert Hall in Istanbul.

Locke was frequently cited as an ambassador of Native American culture to the United States and the world. He was also active on the board of directors of the Lakota Language Consortium, a non-profit organization working towards the Lakota language revitalization. He was also on the advisory board of the World Flute Society.

Awards and honors
 1988 Bush Foundation Fellowship
 1990 National Heritage Fellowship
 1999 Native American Music Awards, Best Traditional Recording (The First Flute) 
 2009 Native American Music Awards, Album of the Year (Earth Gift)
 2009 Independent Music Awards Vox Pop World Traditional Album Winner for First Lightning
 2009 Bush Foundation Enduring Vision Award
 2020 International Academy for Human Sciences and Culture Peace Prize

Recordings
From 1982, Locke recorded 13 albums of music and stories, including:

 Dream Catcher as Tokeya Inajin (July 13, 1993)
 Keepers of the Dream ( June 27, 1995)
 Love Songs of the Lakota (September 29, 1995)
 The Flood and Other Lakota Stories (The Parabola Storytime Series) Harper Audio (March 1996) 
 The Flash in the Mirror (April 2, 1996)
 Open Circle (Oct 15, 1996)
 The First Flute (July 27, 1999) — won the Native American Music Award for Best Traditional Recording. 
 Midnight Strong Heart (January 1, 2003)

Publications
 Arising, Wilmette, IL : Baha'i Publishing, 2018
 Lakota Hoop Dancer, with Suzanne Haldane and Jacqueline Left Hand Bull, Dutton Juvenile; 1st edition (May 1, 1999).
 Real Dakota! : About Dakota by Dakotans! : The life, people & history of the Dakotas by the people who know and love it! by Kevin Locke, Tempe, AZ : Blue Bird Pub., 1988.

Films
Songkeepers (1999, 48 min.).  Directed by Bob Hercules and Bob Jackson.  Produced by Dan King.  Lake Forest, Illinois: America's Flute Productions.  Five distinguished traditional flute artists - Tom Mauchahty-Ware, Sonny Nevaquaya, R. Carlos Nakai, Hawk Littlejohn, Kevin Locke – talk about their instrument and their songs and the role of the flute and its music in their tribes.

Further reading

See also
 Baháʼí Faith and Native Americans
 Nipo T. Strongheart, another Native cultural performance artist and Baháʼí.

References

External links

 
Turtle Island Storytellers

Reviews
Celebrating the Circles That Signify Our Lives By Jennifer Dunning January 21, 2008
Musicpicks: Kevin Locke
Seattle Times:Telling stories, saving heritage through dance
Everett Herald: Lakota dancer reaches out to kids

1954 births
2022 deaths
Native American flautists
American Bahá'ís
Hunkpapa people
Institute of American Indian Arts alumni
Native American flute players
Native American dancers
20th-century Bahá'ís
21st-century Bahá'ís
Dancers from California
National Heritage Fellowship winners
University of South Dakota alumni
University of North Dakota alumni
20th-century American musicians
20th-century American male musicians
20th-century American dancers
21st-century American musicians
21st-century American male musicians
21st-century American dancers
Musicians from South Dakota
Dancers from South Dakota
20th-century flautists
21st-century flautists